Qaratlu (also Romanized as Qarātlū; also known as Gharatloo and Kanatlu) is a village in Mehraban-e Sofla Rural District, Gol Tappeh District, Kabudarahang County, Hamadan Province, Iran. At the 2006 census, its population was 462, in 118 families.

References 

Populated places in Kabudarahang County